is a former Japanese football player. Takaki Tomozawa is his brother.

Playing career
Goki Tomozawa played for YSCC Yokohama from 2013 to 2015.

References

External links

1991 births
Living people
Hosei University alumni
Association football people from Kanagawa Prefecture
Japanese footballers
J3 League players
Japan Football League players
YSCC Yokohama players
Association football forwards